Mark Edmondson and Sherwood Stewart were the defending champions, but lost in the final this year.

Sammy Giammalva Jr. and Tony Giammalva won the title, defeating Edmondson and Stewart 7–6, 6–4 in the final.

Seeds

  Anders Järryd /  Tomáš Šmíd (semifinals)
  Mark Edmondson /  Sherwood Stewart (final)
  Ken Flach /  Robert Seguso (semifinals)
  John Fitzgerald /  Ferdi Taygan (quarterfinals)

Draw

Draw

External links
Draw

Tokyo Indoor
1984 Grand Prix (tennis)